Tutti Frutti is an action game written by Alan M. Newman for the Atari 8-bit family and published in 1982 by Adventure International. It was later re-released in Germany by QuelleSoft in 1984. The game is programmed in Atari BASIC.

Gameplay
The object of Tutti Frutti is to eat all the fruits within the time limit. The game sets the stage inside a jungle clearing surrounded by trees, where the player is constantly pursued by deadly bugs as he races against the clock to clear a level. Each stage contains different fruits (bananas, grapes, oranges and plums), trees (which merely hinder the player's movement) and special objects (like ice creams worth a lot of points, but eating it angers the bugs). The player starts with 3 lives, when all are lost the game ends.

Reception
The Addison-Wesley Book of Atari Software 1984 gave it an overall rating of "D" and concluded: "In short, the game isn't exciting, is somewhat repetitious, yet offers who like this style of game a challenge on its upper levels."

References

External links

1982 video games
Action video games
Atari 8-bit family games
Atari 8-bit family-only games
Video games about food and drink
Video games developed in the United States